The City of New York is home to many arts organizations. They include:

 American Dance Festival
 Bronx Council on the Arts
 Brooklyn Academy of Music
 Brooklyn Historic Railway Association
 City Parks Foundation
 Creative Time
 Lincoln Center for the Performing Arts
 Municipal Art Society
 New York Foundation for the Arts
 The Public Theater

New York City-related lists
Culture of New York City